Laughing at Danger is a 1924 American silent action film directed by James W. Horne and starring Richard Talmadge, Joseph W. Girard, and Eva Novak.

Plot
As described in a review in a film magazine, a love affair makes Alan Remington (Talmadge) dissatisfied with life. Trying to lift his son out of despondency, his father Cyrus (Girard) devises various means of excitement. Crooks seek to steal a death ray machine which the elder Remington is sponsoring and circumstance involves Alan in the subsequent excitement. Thinking it is only a trick of his father’s, he takes danger lightly. The inventor Professor Leo Hollister (Harrington) and his daughter Carolyn (Novak) are captured and, with the machine, imprisoned in a hut on a lonely hill. Alan goes to the rescue. Naval vessels are warned that the desperadoes intend to blow them up with the death ray and turn their guns on the hut and destroy it. Alan leaps to safety in the nick of time.

Cast

Preservation
Prints of Laughing at Danger are held in the collections of the Gosfilmofond in Moscow and UCLA Film And Television Archive.

References

Bibliography
 Munden, Kenneth White. The American Film Institute Catalog of Motion Pictures Produced in the United States, Part 1. University of California Press, 1997.

External links

1924 films
1920s action films
American silent feature films
American action films
Films directed by James W. Horne
American black-and-white films
Film Booking Offices of America films
1920s English-language films
1920s American films